The German Army Command is the high command of the German Army of the Bundeswehr. The headquarters also is the staff of the Inspector of the Army, the most senior Army officer. It was formed in 2012, as a merger of the Army Office (Heeresamt), Army Staff (Führungsstab des Heeres), and Army Forces Command (Heeresführungskommando), as part of a larger reorganization of the Bundeswehr. It is based at the von-Hardenberg-Kaserne in Strausberg, Brandenburg.

The command supports the army inspector in performing his planning, command, control and control tasks. It ensures the operational readiness of the army in material and personnel terms and directs the subordinate units and departments:

Army Development Office (Amt für Heeresentwicklung), (Cologne)
Training Command (Ausbildungskommando), (HQ Leipzig)
1st Panzer Division (Bundeswehr) (HQ Oldenburg)
10th Panzer Division (Bundeswehr) (HQ Veitshöchheim)
Rapid Forces Division (HQ Stadtallendorf)

See also 
Structure of the German Army

References 

Units and formations of the German Army (1956–present)
National army headquarters
Military units and formations established in 2012
Army commands (military formations)